Haya may refer to:

Biology
 Haya (dinosaur), a genus of basal ornithopod dinosaur that lived during the Late Cretaceous from Mongolia
 Haya (plant), a genus of plants in the family Caryophyllaceae
 Haya de Herguijuela (Spanish: beech of Herguijela), a solitary specimen of European beech growing near the town of Herguijuela de la Sierra, Spain
 Fagus mexicana, or haya, a species of beech
 Myrica faya, or haya, a species of Myrica

People
 Haya bint Hussein (born 1974), former wife of Sheikh Mohammed bin Rashid Al Maktoum ruler of Dubai and daughter of King Hussein of Jordan
 Haya Kaspi, Israeli mathematician
 Haya bint Saad Al Sudairi (1913–2003), wife of Ibn Saud, founder of Saudi Arabia
 Víctor Raúl Haya de la Torre (1895–1979), Peruvian politician
 William II de Haya (12th century), a Norman knight who is considered to be the progenitor of the Scottish Clan Hay

Places
 Hidaj, also written as Hayā, a city in Iran
 M'Haya, Meknès Prefecture, Fès-Meknès, Morocco
 Haya River (Kanagawa), a river in Kanagawa, Japan

Other uses
 Haya (god), in ancient Mesopotamian religion
 Haya (Islam), an Islamic term for modesty
 La Haya, Spanish name for The Hague, in particular seen in references to Hague Conventions
 Haya Party (Life Party), an Egyptian political party
 Haya people, a people of Tanzania
 Haya language, the language of the Haya people
 Haya Station, a railway station in Tanabe, Wakayama Prefecture, Japan
 Hay'a tradition, in Islamic astronomy